North Creek is a stream in the U.S. state of South Dakota.

North Creek runs north of Slim Buttes, hence the name.

See also
List of rivers of South Dakota

References

Rivers of Harding County, South Dakota
Rivers of South Dakota